Khandoker Mohammad Nurunnabi (31 July 1946 – 8 December 2016) was a Bangladesh Army Major General who served in the Bangladesh Liberation War in 1971. He was awarded the National Sports Awards in 2002, for his contribution to Bangladeshi football as a member of the Shadhin Bangla football team.

Football career
In 1963, Nurunnabi began his football career by joining Azad Sporting Club, where he played until 1964. The following year, Nurunnabi's fulfilled his dream of playing for Mohammedan SC, who were at the time the most popular team in East Pakistan. During his time with the Black & Whites he played alongside group of legendary players like Zakaria Pintoo, Protap Sanker Hazra, Mohamed Kaikobad and Golam Sarwar Tipu. He spent six years in Mohammedan, winning three Dhaka League titles and one Aga Khan Gold Cup (1968) trophy. While at Mohammedan, he got a job at the National Bank of Pakistan (now Sonali Bank). 

In 1970, Nurunnabi became the last debutant from East Pakistan to represent the Pakistan national football team, as he travelled to Tehran, Iran to participate in the 1970 RCD Cup. During the tournament, Nurunabbi played against both Iran and Turkey. Nurunnabi, is among only four goalkeepers from East Pakistan to represent the Pakistan national team, the others being Wazed Ali Miyaji, Manzur Hasan Mintu and Shahidur Rahman Shantoo.

In 1971, after witnessing the massacre caused by Operation Searchlight, Nurunnabi alongside Mohammedan SC teammate Pratap Shankar Hazra, crossed the border to Agartala, India, and then to Kolkata, where he joined the Shadhin Bangla football team. His only appearance for the Shadhin Bangla team came in their first game, which ended as a 2–2 draw against Nadia XI, in July 24. After the game, he met another one of his Mohammedan colleagues, Hafizuddin Ahmed, who helped Nurunnabi join the Bangladesh Liberation War.

Military

Bangladesh Liberation War
After returning to East Pakistan with Hafizuddin Ahmed, Nurunnabi trained as a member of the Bangladesh Army, he was later ordered to took up arms at Kushtia of Sector Eight, under Major Muhammed Abul Manzur, as a sub-sector commander.

Following Bangladesh's independence, Nurunnabi decided to quit football and remain in the army. Noorunnabi was one of the first commissioned officers of the Bangladesh Army, after indpendece. As an officer, he led three infantry battalions. He also served as Rangamati's Sector Commander of Border Guard Bangladesh Rifles (now Border Guard Bangladesh). He retired from the army in 2001, as a Major General, while also being the director general of the Bangladesh Ansar and Village Defence Party.

In 2013, he released an autobiography called "From Dhaka Stadium to Sector 8".

Death
On 8 December 2016, Nurunnabi died of cardiac arrest at the Combined Military Hospital in Dhaka, at the age of 70.

References

1947 births
2016 deaths
Bangladesh Army generals
Bangladesh Army officers
Bangladeshi footballers
Pakistan international footballers
Mohammedan SC (Dhaka) players
Recipients of the Bangladesh National Sports Award
Mukti Bahini personnel